Berkeley (pronounced BURK-lee) is a village located in Cook County, Illinois, United States. Incorporated in 1924, the population at the 2020 census was 5,338.

The town has a commuter railroad station on Metra's Union Pacific/West Line with service to downtown Chicago.

Berkeley is situated fourteen miles west of the Chicago Loop in Cook County. Berkeley is on the western edge of Cook County. Berkeley has instant access to the metropolitan area, with Interstates 290 and 294 comprising its western and part of its southern boundaries, and the Union Pacific Railroad (originally the Chicago & North Western) and the large Proviso classification yard to the north. However, the transit arteries that link Berkeley to separate locations also function to isolate the village from its close neighbours, providing it a small-town atmosphere.

Geography
Berkeley is located at  (41.886794, -87.910528).

History

Farmers, mostly of German and Dutch heritage, began to settle in the region that would become Berkeley around 1835. The Dutch sought to be truck farmers, dwelling on farms spanning from 40 to 160 acres, whereas the Germans conducted general farming. In 1848, a small group of farm families founded Sunnyside, a one-room school. Sunnyside Elementary School is still in operation today, however it is now located in a bigger and newer structure. Farmland was provided for what is now known as Old Settler's Cemetery a short distance west on St. Charles Road (which was finished in 1836).

The Chicago, Aurora & Elgin Railroad (interurban) opened in 1902, providing the area with its first passenger rail service at Berkeley. Subdivisions were made in 1908 and again in 1914-1915 introduced new residential building and new inhabitants to the region, who were mostly English. Berkeley became a village in 1924, thanks to the efforts of these people.

The early 1900s population surge paled in comparison to the post-World War II population explosion in Berkeley, which saw the village population treble from 1,882 in 1950 to 5,792 in 1960. Berkeley also lost a number of homes when the Interstate 290 expansion was built in the late 1950s, cutting a north–south swath across the village's western part. The Chicago, Aurora & Elgin Railway ceased passenger service in 1957 when traffic was transferred to the new expressway system, but its path is still preserved through the community by the Prairie Path for bicyclists.

Berkeley bought property from the railroad in the 1960s to stretch its northern borders, enabling for the development of a small industrial park. Electrical contractors, printing firms, warehouses, wholesalers, and the World Dryer Corporation, one of the world's largest hand dryer manufacturers, were among the facility's 12 light industries in 2000. Berkeley, on the other hand, has remained mostly a residential neighborhood. Many of the residents who bought houses in the village in the 1950s stayed into the 1990s. The village anticipated large residential turnover when these long-term homeowners sold their homes at the turn of the twenty-first century.

Demographics
As of the 2020 census there were 5,338 people, 1,793 households, and 1,339 families residing in the village. The racial makeup of the village was 32.60% African American, 27.58% White, 4.23% Asian, 1.85% Native American, 0.06% Pacific Islander, 22.26% from other races, and 11.43% from two or more races. Hispanic or Latino of any race were 37.62% of the population.

There were 1,793 households, out of which 38.98% had children under the age of 18 living with them, 54.60% were married couples living together, 13.72% had a female householder with no husband present, and 25.32% were non-families. 22.09% of all households were made up of individuals, and 11.38% had someone living alone who was 65 years of age or older. The average household size was 3.30 and the average family size was 2.82.

The village's age distribution consisted of 19.9% under the age of 18, 9.5% from 18 to 24, 25.7% from 25 to 44, 28.6% from 45 to 64, and 16.4% who were 65 years of age or older. The median age was 42.3 years. For every 100 females, there were 114.8 males. For every 100 females age 18 and over, there were 96.9 males.

The median income for a household in the village was $71,025, and the median income for a family was $72,051. Males had a median income of $48,333 versus $30,346 for females. The per capita income for the village was $29,940. About 0.5% of families and 3.1% of the population were below the poverty line, including 0.0% of those under age 18 and 9.7% of those age 65 or over.

Note: the US Census treats Hispanic/Latino as an ethnic category. This table excludes Latinos from the racial categories and assigns them to a separate category. Hispanics/Latinos can be of any race.

Education 
Most children in Berkeley attend schools in Berkeley School District 87 which are Sunnyside Elementary School and MacArthur Middle School. Others attend Hillside School in Hillside School District 93.

Proviso Township High Schools District 209 operates public high schools. The community is served by Proviso West High School in Hillside. Berkeley residents may apply to Proviso Math & Science Academy in Forest Park.

Private school education is available in the Berkeley area with Immanuel Lutheran grade schools in Hillside, Immaculate Conception, Visitation, and Immanuel Lutheran grade schools in neighboring Elmhurst. High school age students have several schools to choose from in the Berkeley area including Immaculate Conception High School in Elmhurst and Nazareth Academy in LaGrange Park. Timothy Christian school in Elmhurst is also an option and has students from K through 12. Lastly, an option that has been growing in popularity is Walther Christian Academy in Melrose Park.

Companies based in Berkeley 
 Vanee Foods
 Preferred Meals
 World Dryer
 Honey-Can-Do International
 Conflowence

Sister city
The village has a sister city in England, Berkeley, Gloucestershire.

References

External links
Village of Berkeley official website
Berkeley Public Library
Hillside Public Library – Hillside & Berkeley community resources
Berkeley Fire Department
Berkeley entry in the Encyclopedia of Chicago

Villages in Illinois
Chicago metropolitan area
Villages in Cook County, Illinois
Populated places established in 1924
1924 establishments in Illinois
Majority-minority cities and towns in Cook County, Illinois